We've Been Going About This All Wrong is the sixth studio album by American singer-songwriter Sharon Van Etten. It was released on May 6, 2022, by Jagjaguwar. On October 6, 2022, Van Etten announced a deluxe version of the album which released November 11.

Background 
Four singles were released prior to the album's release. "Mistakes", which was released May 9, 2022; and "Headspace", which was released July 7; were both included on the original album. "Porta", released February 8; and "Used to It", released March 1; were originally released as standalone singles before being announced as part of the deluxe edition on October 6. "Never Gonna Change" was released as a single the same day as the deluxe announcement, and "When I Die" released the same day as the deluxe album's release on November 11.

Music videos were released for the first four singles. The video for "Mistakes" shows Van Etten wandering around Brooklyn, meeting friends and dancing in the street. The "Porta" video depicts Van Etten practicing pilates and was inspired by Van Etten's friendship with North Carolina pilates instructor Stella Cook. The "Headspace" video was directed by Ashley Connor and depicts Van Etten taking cellphones away from a couple portrayed by dancers Coco Karol and Miguel Angel Guzmán and encouraging them to embrace each other. The video for "Used to It" features Van Etten dancing with choreographer Hayden J. Frederick, and was directed by Van Etten's musical director and bandmate Charley Damski.

The album is named after a line of dialogue in the 1993 movie The Sandlot, a movie Van Etten says she has watched "probably ... 100 times" with her son.

Reception

Year-end lists

Track listing

Personnel

Musicians
 Sharon Van Etten – vocals, keyboards , guitar , drums , synthesizer , tambourine , piano , organ 
 Jorge Balbi – drums , percussion 
 Charley Damski – synthesizer , guitar , glockenspiel 
 Devin Hoff – guitar 
 Jay Bellerose – drums 
 Benji Lysaght – guitar 
 Zachary Dawes – guitar 
 Daniel Knowles – bass , percussion 
 Owen Pallett – strings 
 Dave Palmer – piano

Technical
 Sharon Van Etten – recording engineer 
 Daniel Knowles – recording engineer , programming 
 Joe LaPorta – mastering engineer
 Beatriz Artola – mixing engineer
 Mike Piersante – recording engineer 
 Jorge Balbi – programming

Charts

References

2022 albums
Sharon Van Etten albums
Jagjaguwar albums
Indie rock albums by American artists